Lozotaenia manticopa is a species of moth of the  family Tortricidae. It is found in the Democratic Republic of Congo.

References

Archipini
Moths described in 1934
Moths of Africa
Taxa named by Edward Meyrick
Endemic fauna of the Democratic Republic of the Congo